Roy Gregory (born March 6, 1990) is an Antiguan footballer who currently plays for Antigua Barracuda FC in the USL Professional Division and the Antigua and Barbuda national team.

Club career
Gregory began his professional career in 2007 with Freemansville in the Antigua and Barbuda Premier Division, and spent two seasons there, before moving to All Saints United in 2009.

In 2011 Gregory transferred to the new Antigua Barracuda FC team prior to its first season in the USL Professional Division. He made his debut for the Barracudas in their first competitive game on April 17, 2011, a 2-1 loss to the Los Angeles Blues.

International career
Gregory made his debut for the Antigua and Barbuda national team in 2008, and has since gone on to make fifteen appearances for his country, scoring two goal.

National team statistics

International goals
Scores and results list Antigua and Barbuda's goal tally first.

References

External links

1990 births
Living people
Antigua and Barbuda footballers
Antigua Barracuda F.C. players
USL Championship players
Antigua and Barbuda international footballers
Association football defenders
Antigua and Barbuda under-20 international footballers
Antigua and Barbuda youth international footballers